Redonda is an uninhabited Caribbean island that is a part of Antigua and Barbuda, in the Leeward Islands, West Indies.

Redonda is home to vast numbers of sea birds, and the island was an important source of guano before artificial fertilisers started to be mass-produced. Guano-mining operations started in the 1860s and ceased after the start of World War I. During these mining operations a few buildings and other installations were put in place on the island, and some physical remnants of that phase in its history are still visible.

"Redonda" is the female form of the Spanish language adjective meaning "round". In 1493, on his second voyage to the New World, Christopher Columbus discovered the island and named it "Santa María la Redonda" (the Spanish language meaning "Saint Mary the Round").

The island was annexed by the Antiguan Parish of Saint John on the 26th of March, 1872.

Description

At a distance, Redonda appears as if it were one very large rock. It is the remnant of an ancient extinct volcano. The land rises from sea level mostly as sheer cliffs, especially on the leeward (west) side. At the top of the island there is a relatively flat but tilted area of grassland which slopes to the east. There is no source of fresh water other than rain.

Judging by the name he gave the island, to Columbus the island appeared to be rounded, at least in profile. In reality the island is long and narrow, and reaches a height of almost 1,000 feet.

Redonda is uninhabited. The difficult topography, the lack of a safe place to land a boat, and the absence of any freshwater source other than rainfall makes the island inhospitable to humans.

A herd of feral goats and thousands of rats were cleared from the island in 2017 as part of a island restoration programme.

History
In 1493, Christopher Columbus and his crew became the first known Europeans to see Redonda, on his second journey. He claimed it for the Crown of Castile, but did not land there. He named the island Santa María la Redonda, meaning Saint Mary the Round, reflecting the island's apparent profile when viewed from the side.

Because the island is a rock of just over a square kilometre, it did not represent any interest for the powers involved in the colonisation of the Americas and, for centuries, it was a refuge for pirates.

In the 1860s, the island became a British possession.

During the decades after the 1860s, the rich guano deposits of Redonda were mined for fertiliser, with an annual yield of up to 7,000 tons. Only during this time was the island inhabited by workers; the population was 120 in 1901. After the guano mining, aluminium phosphate for gunpowder production was discovered and mined.  A cableway was constructed to transport material down to the loading pier on the coast.

In 1914, during the First World War, the mining operations ceased, and most workers left the island. Maintenance workers remained on the island until 1929, when a hurricane destroyed almost all the remaining facilities. The island has remained uninhabited since then. Two stone huts still stand from the time when the island was occupied. Although the closest island to Redonda is Montserrat, and the second closest is Nevis, in 1967 Redonda became a dependency of the more distant Antigua, now part of Antigua and Barbuda.

Scientists from the Montserrat Volcano Observatory visit the island in a helicopter periodically; they are using Redonda as an observation point from which to take measurements of the Soufrière Hills, an active volcano on Montserrat.

Ecology and conservation 
Animals endemic to the island include the Redonda ground dragon, the Redonda anole and an unnamed species of dwarf gecko. The island is a breeding colony for multiple species of seabirds.

The island's local ecology was severely affected by invasive species, particularly introduced goats and rats, for almost a century. Island restoration efforts were initiated in the 2016, beginning with removing the island's 60 goats and roughly 6000 rats. The Redonda Restoration Programme involves the Environmental Awareness Group, Wildlife Management International and Fauna and Flora International. Several years after the goats were removed, some local plant life began to recover.

Micronation

Redonda is the setting of the myth of the "Kingdom of Redonda". M. P. Shiel, an author of fantasy novels, claimed that in the year of his birth, 1865, his father Matthew Dowdy Shiell, from Montserrat, decided to celebrate his first male child by arranging for the boy to be crowned King of Redonda at the age of 15, in a ceremony purportedly carried out on the small island by a bishop.

Shiel first mentioned the idea of the "Kingdom of Redonda" in a promotional leaflet for his books. Since then, the title has been "passed down", and continues to the present day. For a period of time the "Royal" lineage of Redonda had a more or less solely literary theme, with the title being given to writers, such as John Gawsworth and Jon Wynne-Tyson. Wynne-Tyson (King Juan II), his successor the Spanish novelist Javier Marías (King Xavier), and rival contenders for the Redondan title, such as Gawsworth, William L. Gates and Bob Williamson, were featured in a BBC Radio 4 documentary, Redonda: The Island with Too Many Kings, which was broadcast in May 2007.

See also
Rodondo Island, in Bass Strait between Australia and Tasmania, which was named for its resemblance to Redonda

Notes

References

External links
Antigua and Barbuda Museum

 
Uninhabited islands of Antigua and Barbuda
Stacks (geology)
Dependencies of Antigua and Barbuda
Former populated places in Antigua and Barbuda
Populated places established in the 15th century
1967 establishments in Antigua and Barbuda
States and territories established in 1967
Saint John Parish, Antigua and Barbuda